Lü Xuean (born 26 April 1999) is a Chinese footballer currently playing as a right-back for Wuxi Wugou.

Club career
After two seasons in Japan, Lü returned to China with Wuhan Three Towns in 2019.

Career statistics

Club
.

Notes

References

1999 births
Living people
People from Zhenjiang
Footballers from Jiangsu
Chinese footballers
China youth international footballers
Association football defenders
Jiangsu F.C. players
Shonan Bellmare players
Iwate Grulla Morioka players
Wuhan Three Towns F.C. players
Chinese expatriate footballers
Chinese expatriate sportspeople in Japan
Expatriate footballers in Japan